Drogomin  (German Heinersdorf) is a village in the administrative district of Gmina Sulęcin, within Sulęcin County, Lubusz Voivodeship, in western Poland.

The village has a population of 200.

References

Drogomin